The Dom Luís I Bridge, or Luís I Bridge, is a double-deck metal arch bridge that spans the River Douro between the cities of Porto and Vila Nova de Gaia in Portugal. At its construction, its  span was the longest of its type in the world.

History

 

In 1879, Gustave Eiffel presented a project to construct a new bridge over the Douro, with a high single deck in order to facilitate ship navigation. This project was rejected due to dramatic growth of the urban population, which required a re-thinking of the limits of a single-deck platform.

A competition was initiated in November 1880, in order to construct a double-deck metal bridge, which included projects by Compagnie de Fives-Lille, Cail & C., Schneider & Co., Gustave Eiffel, Lecoq & Co., Société de Braine-le-Comte, Société des Batignolles (which submitted two ideas), Andrew Handyside & Co., Société de Construction de Willebroek (also two projects) and John Dixon. It was in January of the following year that deliberations by the committee supported the project of Société de Willebroek, a design that cost 369 000$000 réis and provided better carrying capacity. On 21 November 1881, the public work was awarded to the Belgian Société de Willebroek, from Brussels, for 402 contos. It was to be administrated by Théophile Seyrig, a disciple of Gustave Eiffel and author of the project. Seyrig had worked on the D. Maria bridge with Eiffel, hence the resemblance of his new bridge to the D. Maria bridge. Construction began on the Ponte Luís I alongside the towers of an earlier railway suspension bridge, the Ponte Pênsil, which was disassembled.

On 30 October construction of the main arch and upper deck were concluded, resulting in its inauguration the very next day. On 1 November, a toll system began to operate under the administration of the winning company, that was equal to 4 reís per person. The following year the lower deck was inaugurated, completing the project. During its ceremonies, the bridge was blessed by Bishop D. Américo.

By the turn of the century (1908) electric carriages were installed in the city centre, extending to the bridge.

On 1 January 1944, the toll system was extinguished and the bridge began to function as free infrastructure of the municipal authority of Porto. Originally and for more than a century, the bridge carried road traffic on both decks.  Along with other vehicles, electric trams crossed the upper deck from 1908 until May 1959, and trolleybuses crossed both decks from May 1959 until 1993. By 1954, public works were initiated on the bridge under the direction of engineer Edgar Cardoso, who extended the decks and removed the electrification of the deck.

In 1982, the bridge was designated a cultural heritage Imóvel de Interesse Público (Property of Public Interest) by national agency IGESPAR, the Portuguese Institute for the Management of Architectural and Archaeological Heritage.

On 27 June 2003, the upper deck was closed to motor traffic in order to adapt the structure for the metro system. Infante Dom Henrique Bridge,  upriver, was completed three months earlier to provide an alternative vehicle connection between Porto and Vila Nova de Gaia.  The new "D Line" was inaugurated on 18 September 2005, and opened to the metro trams and pedestrian traffic. With more traffic and demographic growth, in March 2006, a project to enlarge the lower deck was elaborated by architect Virgínio Moutinho and engineers António and José António Campos e Matos. However, the municipal council of Porto asked the Direção-Geral do Património Cultural (Directorate-General for Cultural Patrimony) to avoid a decision on the project, as it was being rethought.

Architecture
The bridge is situated in an isolated, urban area over the River Douro between the granite banks, where the Cathedral of Porto and the escarpment of the Serra do Pilar form a box valley. On the Porto side, the lower deck connects the Cais da Ribeira and the upper Avenida Vímara Peres, while the bank of Vila Nova de Gaia to the Avenida Diogo Leite and Avenida da República, respectively. Access to the Porto side is located along the Pillars of Ponte Pênsil, while the Guindais Funicular, the Church and Shelter of Ferro, the Fernandina Walls and the Monastery of Serra do Pilar.

The iron bridge has two decks, of differing heights and widths, between which develop a large  diameter, central arch supporting these upper and lower decks. Both decks are moored to the riverbanks by means of masonry piers. Those in the upper deck, are rectangular with a trimmed cornice finish, consisting of two staggered registers separated by cornice and interlacing struts. The lower deck is based on large foundations supporting molded cornices and wedges linked together by a felled arch, and framed by interlacing beams. At the base of the arches, facing the riverbanks, are large marble plaques with inscriptions "PONTE LUIZ I", and on the upstream face are stones representing royal coat-of-arms, with a shield framed by garlands. At the base of the lower deck, are iron-pillared, pyramidal-truncated pillars, erected in three sections, that attach to the upper deck.

The bridge has an asphalt pavement for vehicular traffic, separated by cast iron guards, that limit the pedestrian sidewalks, that develop laterally. The central arch emerges from the bollards at the foundations and decreasing thickness towards the center. The upper deck, also flanked by pedestrian walkways protected by cast iron guards (similar to the lower deck), was also asphalt-paved until converted to carry light rail trains of the Porto Metro in the mid-2000s. From this deck are lamps used for illumination, confronting and connected, forming decorative circles at the angles. Under the guard is cut-out-like lambrequin decorated with phytomorphic elements.

References

Sources

External links 

 
 Dom Luís Bridge on en.Broer.no

Deck arch bridges
Bridges completed in 1886
Bridges in Porto
Bridges over the Douro River
Double-decker bridges
Road-rail bridges in Portugal
Arch bridges in Portugal
Properties of Public Interest in Portugal
Listed bridges in Portugal